A serranito is a warm sandwich prepared in Andalusia, quite popular in Seville. It is the Andalusian traditional cuisine version of fast food.

The main ingredients are grilled meat (chicken or pork loin), cured ham, fried green pepper and sliced tomato. Other versions also include omelet, lettuce, cheese or fried bacon. It is served with french fries and frequently with sauces like mojo picón, mayonnaise or alioli.

It is generally consumed at lunch or dinner, as a main dish after a snack of tapas. It is quite typical in fairs and verbenas.

As the origin of this typical dish today, there are the "Échate pa' ya" bars in the Cerro del Águila and Juan XXIII neighborhoods of Seville in the 1970s. From that formula, the ex-bullfighter José Luis Cabeza Hernández, who during his active time was known as José Luis del Serranito, patented the trademark and the term Serranito, as well as the tapa.

References 

Spanish cuisine
Andalusian cuisine